A plastic-tipped bullet is a type of hollow-point bullet tipped with a nose cone made of synthetic polymer to give it a pointed spitzer-like shape.

Design and use 

The bullets consist of a fairly normal hollow-point bullet with the frontal cavity filled in by hard plastic, which is molded into a streamlined shape. Most tips are made of polyoxymethylene, although some manufacturers have used polyester urethane-methylenebis(phenylisocyanate) copolymer.

Upon impact, the plastic drives into the hollow point and the bullet performs like a standard hollow-point, expanding ("mushrooming") to a larger diameter. These bullets possess the aerodynamics for longer, more accurate flights, and the in-target performance to ensure high lethality.

Traditionally, these bullets are intended for use in rifles and single-shot handguns, as pistols are not normally used at the great distances where the streamlined ballistic tip is advantageous.  However, a few companies produce pistol ammunition with plastic-tipped hollow points where the plastic is molded into a more rounded tip.  These designs are not created to increase the streamlining of the bullet but rather to improve ammunition feeding in semi-automatic pistols that are prone to jams with standard hollow point ammunition.  Examples of such pistol ammunition include Cor-Bon/Glaser’s "Glaser Pow'RBall" line and Extreme Shock's "NyTrilium Air Freedom" ammunition (the "NyTrilium Air Freedom" cartridge also mimics the performance of Glaser Safety Slug cartridges, as it uses hollow bullets full of powdered metal designed to fragment rapidly on hitting a target).

"Ballistic Tip" is a registered trademark of Nosler, but numerous other companies produce similar projectiles, including Hornady and Sierra.  Nosler uses a color code to indicate caliber on the polymer bullet tips, to make them easily distinguishable from each other: .224 orange,.257-blue, 6mm-purple, 6.5mm-tan, .270-yellow, 7mm-red, .30-green, .338-maroon and 8mm-dark blue.

Examples 
Notable examples include:

 .17 HMR
 .204 Ruger
 FN 5.7×28mm
 .30-30 Winchester
 .308 Winchester
 .460 S&W Magnum

See also 

 APCBC

References 

Bullets